Friedrich Gustav Adolf Neumann (5 June 1825 – 20 November 1884), was a German painter and engraver. Many of his portraits were published in Die Gartenlaube and the Illustrirte Zeitung. His brother was the wood engraver, .

His father worked as a colorist. Although his family was very poor, he gained the approval of Veit Hanns Schnorr von Carolsfeld, who accepted him as his student at the Academy of Fine Arts.

He was best known for his portraits, especially those of musicians, including Franz Schubert, Robert Franz and August Wilhelm Ambros.

References

 "Neumann, Adolf". In: Hans Vollmer (Ed.): Allgemeines Lexikon der Bildenden Künstler von der Antike bis zur Gegenwart, Vol.25: Moehring–Olivié. E. A. Seemann, Leipzig 1931, pg.410

External links

 "Neumann, Friedrich Gustav Adolph", In: Singer: Allgemeines Künstler-Lexicon. Vol.3 (1898), pg.299

German engravers
19th-century engravers
1825 births
1884 deaths